Satya is a 2017 Indian Bhojpuri action-romance-drama film directed by Sujeet Kumar Singh and produced by Gajanand Chauhan and Radhe Shyam Lohar. The film features Pawan Singh and Akshara Singh in lead roles while Daya Shankar Pandey, Annu Upadhayay, Bipin Singh, Umesh Singh, Lota Tiwary, Nidhi jhaa and Amrapali Dubey portray pivotal roles. The soundtrack and film score were composed by Chhote Naveen.

Cast
Pawan Singh - Satya
Akshra Singh - Sapna
Daya Shankar Pandey - Tabrez Ansari
Annu Upadhayay - Muskan
Bipin Singh - Lalan Tiwary
Umesh Singh - Chhottan Tiwary
Lota Tiwary
Brijesh Tripathi - Satya's father
Nidhi Jha - special appearance in song Luliya Mangele
Amrapali Dubey - special appearance in song Rate Diya Buta Ke

Soundtrack

The soundtrack for Satya was composed by Chhote Baba with lyrics penned by Vinay Bihari, Manoj Matalbi, Sumit Singh Chandravanshi, Vibhaker Pandey, Arun Bihari and Vinay Nirmal. The soundtrack included an unusually large number of songs at 6. It was produced under the Wave Music. The soundtrack was very successful upon release, becoming one of the top viewed Bhojpuri music videos on YouTube with over 6 million views.

References

2010s Bhojpuri-language films